This is a list of the extreme points of The Americas, the points that are farther north, south, east or west than any other location on the continent.  The continent's southernmost point is often said to be Cape Horn, which is the southernmost point of the Chilean islands. The Americas cross 134° of longitude east to west and 124° of latitude north to south.

The Americas including islands
Northernmost point — Kaffeklubben Island, Greenland 
Southernmost point — Southern Thule, South Georgia and the South Sandwich Islands 
Easternmost point — Nordostrundingen, Greenland 
Westernmost point — Cape Wrangell on Attu Island, Alaska, United States

The continental Americas
Northernmost point — Murchison Promontory, Nunavut, Canada 
Southernmost point — Cape Froward, Magallanes, Chile 
Easternmost point — Ponta do Seixas, Paraíba, Brazil 
Westernmost point — Cape Prince of Wales, Alaska, United States

Highest points

Lowest points

Inland points

Islands

Lakes

Rivers

See also
Geography of the Americas
Geography of North America
Geography of South America
Extreme points of the Earth
Extreme points of the Americas
Extreme points of North America
Extreme points of Central America
Extreme points of the Caribbean
Extreme points of South America

Notes

References

External links

Geography of the Americas
Americas